Kurt Mattsson (born 1 March 1940) is a Finnish boxer. He competed in the men's light middleweight event at the 1964 Summer Olympics. At the 1964 Summer Olympics, he defeated Bekele Alemu of Ethiopia, before losing to Józef Grzesiak of Poland.

References

1940 births
Living people
Finnish male boxers
Olympic boxers of Finland
Boxers at the 1964 Summer Olympics
Sportspeople from Lahti
Light-middleweight boxers